This is an overview of the progression of the Olympic track cycling record of the men's 4000 m individual pursuit, as recognised by the Union Cycliste Internationale (UCI).

The men's 4000-metre individual pursuit was introduced at the 1964 Summer Olympics and was discontinued after the 2008 Summer Olympics. The UCI list the first Olympic record as of 1992 although the event had already been contested at several Olympic Games before.

Progression

† Event formed part of the Omnium, not the stand-alone Individual Pursuit
* Not listed by the UCI as an Olympic record

References

Track cycling Olympic record progressions